The New Hollywood, also known as American New Wave or Hollywood Renaissance, was a movement in American film history from the mid-1960s to the early 1980s, when a new generation of young filmmakers came to prominence.
They influenced the types of film produced, their production and marketing, and the way major studios approached filmmaking. In New Hollywood films, the film director, rather than the studio, took on a key authorial role. The definition of "New Hollywood" varies, depending on the author, with some defining it as a movement and others as a period. The span of the period is also a subject of debate, as well as its integrity, as some authors, such as Thomas Schatz, argue that the New Hollywood consists of several different movements. The films made in this movement are stylistically characterized in that their narrative often deviated from classical norms. After the demise of the studio system and the rise of television, the commercial success of films was diminished.

Successful films of the early New Hollywood era include Bonnie and Clyde, The Graduate, Rosemary's Baby, Night of the Living Dead, The Wild Bunch, and Easy Rider while films that failed at the box office such as New York, New York, Sorcerer, Heaven's Gate, They All Laughed and One from the Heart marked the end of the era.

History

Background 

Following the Paramount Case (which ended block booking and ownership of theater chains by film studios) and the advent of television (where Rod Serling, John Frankenheimer, Paddy Chayefsky and Sidney Lumet worked in their earlier years), both of which severely weakened the traditional studio system, Hollywood studios initially used spectacle to retain profitability. Technicolor developed a far more widespread use, while widescreen processes and technical improvements, such as CinemaScope, stereo sound, and others, such as 3-D, were invented in order to retain the dwindling audience and compete with television. However, these were generally unsuccessful in increasing profits. By 1957, Life magazine called the 1950s "the horrible decade" for Hollywood.

In the 1950s and early 1960s, Hollywood was dominated by musicals, historical epics, and other films that benefited from the larger screens, wider framing, and improved sound. Hence, as early as 1957, the era was dubbed a "New Hollywood". However, audience shares continued to dwindle, and had reached alarmingly low levels by the mid-1960s. Several costly flops, including Tora! Tora! Tora! and Hello, Dolly!, and failed attempts to replicate the success of The Sound of Music, put great strain on the studios.

By the time the Baby Boomer generation started to come of age in the 1960s, "Old Hollywood" was rapidly losing money; the studios were unsure how to react to the much-changed audience demographics. The change in the market during the period went from a middle-aged high school-educated audience in the mid-1960s to a younger, more affluent, college-educated demographic: by the mid-1970s, 76% of all movie-goers were under 30, 64% of whom had gone to college. European films, both arthouse and commercial (especially the Commedia all'italiana, the French New Wave, the Spaghetti Western), and Japanese cinema were making a splash in the United States — the huge market of disaffected youth seemed to find relevance and artistic meaning in movies like Michelangelo Antonioni's Blowup, with its oblique narrative structure and full-frontal female nudity.

The desperation felt by studios during this period of economic downturn, and after the losses from expensive movie flops, led to innovation and risk-taking, allowing greater control by younger directors and producers. Therefore, in an attempt to capture that audience that found a connection to the "art films" of Europe, the studios hired a host of young filmmakers and allowed them to make their films with relatively little studio control. Some of whom, like actor Jack Nicholson and director Peter Bogdanovich, were mentored by "King of the Bs" Roger Corman while others like celebrated cinematographer Vilmos Zsigmond worked for lesser-known B movie directors like Ray Dennis Steckler, known for the 1962 Arch Hall Jr. vehicle Wild Guitar and the 1963 horror musical flick The Incredibly Strange Creatures Who Stopped Living and Became Mixed-Up Zombies. This, together with the breakdown of the Motion Picture Production Code in 1966 and the new ratings system in 1968 (reflecting growing market segmentation) set the scene for the New Hollywood.

Bonnie and Clyde
A defining film of the New Hollywood generation was Bonnie and Clyde (1967). Produced by and starring Warren Beatty and directed by Arthur Penn, its combination of graphic violence and humor, as well as its theme of glamorous disaffected youth, was a hit with audiences. The film won Academy Awards for Best Supporting Actress (Estelle Parsons) and Best Cinematography.

When Jack L. Warner, then-CEO of Warner Bros., first saw a rough cut of Bonnie and Clyde in the summer of 1967, he hated it. Distribution executives at Warner Brothers agreed, giving the film a low-key premiere and limited release. Their strategy appeared justified when Bosley Crowther, middlebrow film critic at The New York Times, gave the movie a scathing review. "It is a cheap piece of bald-faced slapstick comedy," he wrote, "that treats the hideous depredations of that sleazy, moronic pair as though they were as full of fun and frolic as the jazz-age cut-ups in Thoroughly Modern Millie..." Other notices, including those from Time and Newsweek magazines, were equally dismissive.

Its portrayal of violence and ambiguity in regard to moral values, and its startling ending, divided critics. Following one of the negative reviews, Time magazine received letters from fans of the movie, and according to journalist Peter Biskind, the impact of critic Pauline Kael in her positive review of the film (October 1967, New Yorker) led other reviewers to follow her lead and re-evaluate the film (notably Newsweek and Time). Kael drew attention to the innocence of the characters in the film and the artistic merit of the contrast of that with the violence in the film: "In a sense, it is the absence of sadism — it is the violence without sadism — that throws the audience off balance at Bonnie and Clyde. The brutality that comes out of this innocence is far more shocking than the calculated brutalities of mean killers." Kael also noted the reaction of audiences to the violent climax of the movie, and the potential to empathize with the gang of criminals in terms of their naiveté and innocence reflecting a change in expectations of American cinema.

The cover story in Time magazine in December 1967, celebrated the movie and innovation in American New Wave cinema. This influential article by Stefan Kanfer claimed that Bonnie and Clyde represented a "New Cinema" through its blurred genre lines, and disregard for honored aspects of plot and motivation, and that "In both conception and execution, Bonnie and Clyde is a watershed picture, the kind that signals a new style, a new trend." Biskind states that this review and turnaround by some critics allowed the film to be re-released, thus proving its commercial success and reflecting the move toward the New Hollywood. The impact of this film is important in understanding the rest of the American New Wave, as well as the conditions that were necessary for it.

These initial successes paved the way for the studio to relinquish almost complete control to these innovative young filmmakers. In the mid-1970s, idiosyncratic, startling original films such as Paper Moon, Dog Day Afternoon, Chinatown, and Taxi Driver among others, enjoyed enormous critical and commercial success. These successes by the members of the New Hollywood led each of them in turn to make more and more extravagant demands, both on the studio and eventually on the audience.

Characteristics 
This new generation of Hollywood filmmaker was most importantly, from the point of view of the studios, young, therefore able to reach the youth audience they were losing. This group of young filmmakers—actors, writers and directors—dubbed the "New Hollywood" by the press, briefly changed the business from the producer-driven Hollywood system of the past.

Todd Berliner has written about the period's unusual narrative practices. The 1970s, Berliner says, marks Hollywood's most significant formal transformation since the conversion to sound film and is the defining period separating the storytelling modes of the studio era and contemporary Hollywood. New Hollywood films deviate from classical narrative norms more than Hollywood films from any other era or movement. Their narrative and stylistic devices threaten to derail an otherwise straightforward narration. Berliner argues that five principles govern the narrative strategies characteristic of Hollywood films of the 1970s:
 Seventies films show a perverse tendency to integrate, in narrative incidental ways, story information and stylistic devices counterproductive to the films' overt and essential narrative purposes.
 Hollywood filmmakers of the 1970s often situate their film-making practices in between those of classical Hollywood and those of European and Asian art cinema.
 Seventies films prompt spectator responses more uncertain and discomforting than those of more typical Hollywood cinema.
 Seventies narratives place an uncommon emphasis on irresolution, particularly at the moment of climax or in epilogues, when more conventional Hollywood movies busy themselves tying up loose ends.
 Seventies cinema hinders narrative linearity and momentum and scuttles its potential to generate suspense and excitement.
 Seventies cinema also dealt with masculine crises.

Thomas Schatz points to another difference with the Hollywood Golden Age, which deals with the relationship of characters and plot. He argues that plot in classical Hollywood films (and some of the earlier New Hollywood films like The Godfather) "tended to emerge more organically as a function of the drives, desires, motivations, and goals of the central characters". However, beginning with mid-1970s, he points to a trend that "characters became plot functions".

During the height of the studio system, films were made almost exclusively on set in isolated studios. The content of films was limited by the Motion Picture Production Code, and though golden-age film-makers found loopholes in its rules, the discussion of more taboo content through film was effectively prevented. The shift towards a "new realism" was made possible when the Motion Picture Association of America film rating system was introduced and location shooting was becoming more viable. New York City was a favorite spot for this new set of filmmakers due to its gritty atmosphere.

Because of breakthroughs in film technology (e.g. the Panavision Panaflex camera, introduced in 1972), the New Hollywood filmmakers could shoot 35mm camera film in exteriors with relative ease. Since location shooting was cheaper (no sets need to be built) New Hollywood filmmakers rapidly developed the taste for location shooting, resulting in a more naturalistic approach to filmmaking, especially when compared to the mostly stylized approach of classical Hollywood musicals and spectacles made to compete with television during the 1950s and early 1960s. The documentary films of D.A. Pennebaker, the Maysles Brothers and Frederick Wiseman, among others, also influenced filmmakers of this era.

However, in editing, New Hollywood filmmakers adhered to realism more liberally than most of their classical Hollywood predecessors, often using editing for artistic purposes rather than for continuity alone, a practice inspired by European art films and classical Hollywood directors such as D. W. Griffith and Alfred Hitchcock. Films with unorthodox editing included Easy Rider'''s use of jump cuts (influenced by the works of experimental collage filmmaker Bruce Conner) to foreshadow the climax of the movie, as well as subtler uses, such as those to reflect the feeling of frustration in Bonnie and Clyde, the subjectivity of the protagonist in The Graduate and the passage of time in the famous match cut from 2001: A Space Odyssey. Also influential were the works of experimental filmmakers Arthur Lipsett, Bruce Baillie and Kenneth Anger with their combinations of music and imagery and each were cited by George Lucas and Martin Scorsese as influences.

The end of the production code enabled New Hollywood films to feature anti-establishment political themes, the use of rock music, and sexual freedom deemed "counter-cultural" by the studios. The youth movement of the 1960s turned anti-heroes like Bonnie and Clyde and Cool Hand Luke into pop-culture idols, and Life magazine called the characters in Easy Rider "part of the fundamental myth central to the counterculture of the late 1960s." Easy Rider also affected the way studios looked to reach the youth market. The success of Midnight Cowboy, in spite of its "X" rating, was evidence for the interest in controversial themes at the time and also showed the weakness of the rating system and segmentation of the audience.

Interpretations on defining the movement
For Peter Biskind, the new wave was foreshadowed by Bonnie and Clyde and began in earnest with Easy Rider. Biskind's book Easy Riders, Raging Bulls argues that the New Hollywood movement marked a significant shift towards independently produced and innovative works by a new wave of directors, but that this shift began to reverse itself when the commercial success of Jaws and Star Wars led to the realization by studios of the importance of blockbusters, advertising and control over production (even though the success of The Godfather was said to be the precursor to the blockbuster phenomenon).

Writing in 1968, critic Pauline Kael argued that the importance of The Graduate was in its social significance in relation to a new young audience, and the role of mass media, rather than any artistic aspects. Kael argued that college students identifying with The Graduate were not too different from audiences identifying with characters in dramas of the previous decade.

In 1980, film historian/scholar Robert P. Kolker examined New Hollywood film directors in his book A Cinema of Loneliness: Penn, Kubrick, Coppola, Scorsese, Altman, and how their films influenced American society of the 1960s and 1970s. Kolker observed that "for all the challenge and adventure, their films speak to a continual impotence in the world, an inability to change and to create change."

John Belton points to the changing demographic to even younger, more conservative audiences in the mid 1970s (50% aged 12–20) and the move to less politically subversive themes in mainstream cinema, as did Thomas Schatz, who saw the mid- to late 1970s as the decline of the art cinema movement as a significant industry force with its peak in 1974–75 with Nashville and Chinatown.

Geoff King sees the period as an interim movement in American cinema where a conjunction of forces led to a measure of freedom in filmmaking, while Todd Berliner says that 70s cinema resists the efficiency and harmony that normally characterize classical Hollywood cinema and tests the limits of Hollywood's classical model.

According to author and film critic Charles Taylor (Opening Wednesday at a Theater or Drive-In Near You), he stated that "the 1970s remain the third — and, to date, last — great period in American movies".

Author A.D. Jameson (I Find Your Lack of Faith Disturbing), on the other hand, claimed that Star Wars was New Hollywood's finest achievement that actually embodied the characteristics of the respected "serious, sophisticated adult films".

Criticism
The New Hollywood was not without criticism, as in a Los Angeles Times article film critic Manohla Dargis described it as the "halcyon age" of the decade's filmmaking, that "was less revolution than business as usual, with rebel hype". She also pointed out in her New York Times article that New Hollywood enthusiasts insist this was "when American movies grew up (or at least starred underdressed actresses); when directors did what they wanted (or at least were transformed into brands); when creativity ruled (or at least ran gloriously amok, albeit often on the studio's dime)."

This era of American cinema was also criticized for its excessive decadence and on-set mishaps. Even Steven Spielberg, who co-directed/co-produced 1983's Twilight Zone: The Movie with John Landis, was so disgusted by the latter's handling of the deadly helicopter accident that resulted in the death of character actor Vic Morrow and child actors Myca Dinh Le and Renee Shin-Yi Chen, he ended their friendship and publicly called for the end of this era. When approached by the press about the accident, he stated "No movie is worth dying for. I think people are standing up much more now, than ever before, to producers and directors who ask too much. If something isn't safe, it's the right and responsibility of every actor or crew member to yell, 'Cut!'

Legacy
The films of Steven Spielberg, Brian De Palma, Martin Scorsese and Francis Ford Coppola influenced both the Poliziotteschi genre films in Italy and a decade later the Cinéma du look movement in France.

American Eccentric Cinema has been framed as influenced by this era. Both traditions have similar themes and narratives of existentialism and the need for human interaction. The New Hollywood focuses on the darker elements of humanity and society within the context of the American Dream in the mid-1960s to the early 1980s, with themes that were reflective of sociocultural issues and were centered around the potential meaninglessness of pursuing the American Dream as generation upon generation was motivated to possess it. In comparison, American Eccentric Cinema does not have a distinct context, its films show characters who are very individual and their concerns are very distinctive to their own personalities.

The behind-the-scenes of some of the films from this era (Rosemary's Baby, The Exorcist, Twilight Zone: The Movie and The Omen) were also the subjects for the docuseries Cursed Films.

List of selected important and notable figures of the movement

Actors

 Woody Allen
 René Auberjonois
 Ned Beatty
 Warren Beatty
 Candice Bergen
 Jacqueline Bisset
 Karen Black
 Timothy Bottoms
 Peter Boyle
 Beau Bridges
 Jeff Bridges
 Mel Brooks
 Geneviève Bujold
 Ellen Burstyn
 James Caan
 Michael Caine
 Dyan Cannon
 Keith Carradine
 John Cassavetes
 John Cazale
 Julie Christie
 Jill Clayburgh
 Sean Connery
 Bud Cort
 Jamie Lee Curtis
 Beverly D'Angelo
 Robert De Niro
 Bruce Dern
 Danny DeVito
 Michael Douglas
 Brad Dourif
 Richard Dreyfuss
 Faye Dunaway
 Robert Duvall
 Shelley Duvall
 Clint Eastwood
 Peter Falk
 Mia Farrow
 Louise Fletcher
 Jane Fonda
 Peter Fonda
 Harrison Ford
 Jodie Foster
 Teri Garr
 Ben Gazzara
 Richard Gere
 Elliott Gould
 Lee Grant
 Pam Grier
 Charles Grodin
 Gene Hackman
 Mark Hamill
 Goldie Hawn
 Dustin Hoffman
 Anthony Hopkins
 Dennis Hopper
 Glenda Jackson
 Madeline Kahn
 Carol Kane
 Diane Keaton
 Harvey Keitel
 Sally Kellerman
 Margot Kidder
 Kris Kristofferson
 Diane Ladd
 Jessica Lange
 Cloris Leachman
 Malcolm McDowell
 Paul Newman
 Olivia Newton-John
 Jack Nicholson
 Warren Oates
 Ryan O'Neal
 Tatum O'Neal
 Peter O'Toole
 Al Pacino
 Sidney Poitier
 Robert Redford
 Vanessa Redgrave
 Burt Reynolds
 Jason Robards
 Gena Rowlands
 Roy Scheider
 George Segal
 Martin Sheen
 Sam Shepard
 Cybill Shepherd
 Tom Skerritt
 Sissy Spacek
 Sylvester Stallone
 Mary Steenburgen
 Meryl Streep
 Barbra Streisand
 Donald Sutherland
 Lily Tomlin
 Rip Torn
 John Travolta
 Jon Voight
 Sigourney Weaver
 Gene Wilder
 Joanne Woodward

 Directors 

 Woody Allen
 Robert Altman
 Hal AshbyCocaine Parlays with Hal Ashby - Splice Today
 John G. Avildsen
 John Badham
 Ralph Bakshi
 Peter Bogdanovich
 James Bridges
 Mel Brooks
 John Boorman
 John Carpenter
 John Cassavetes
 Michael Cimino
 Francis Ford Coppola
 Roger Corman
 Wes Craven
 Michael Crichton
 Joe Dante
 Brian De Palma
 Richard Donner
 Miloš Forman
 Bob Fosse
 William Friedkin
 Monte Hellman
 George Roy Hill
 Walter Hill
 Arthur Hiller
 Tobe Hooper
 Dennis Hopper
 Henry Jaglom
 Norman Jewison
 Stanley Kubrick
 John Landis
 Tom Laughlin
 George Lucas
 Sidney Lumet
 David Lynch
 Terrence Malick
 Elaine May
 Paul Mazursky
 John Milius
 Ralph Nelson
 Mike Nichols
 Alan J. Pakula
 Sam Peckinpah
 Melvin Van Peebles
 Arthur Penn
 Roman Polanski
 Sydney Pollack
 Bob Rafelson
 Michael Ritchie
 George A. Romero
 Stuart Rosenberg
 Alan Rudolph
 Richard C. Sarafian
 Franklin J. Schaffner
 Jerry Schatzberg
 John Schlesinger
 Paul Schrader
 Martin Scorsese
 Ridley Scott
 Don Siegel
 Steven Spielberg
 James Toback
 Peter Yates
 David Zucker, Jim Abrahams and Jerry Zucker

 Others 

 Dede Allen
 John Alcott
 Nestor Almendros
 John A. Alonzo
 Steven Bach
 Bill Butler
 William Peter Blatty
 Wendy Carlos
 Michael Chapman
 Paddy Chayefsky
 Stewart Copeland
 Pino Donaggio
 Tangerine Dream
 Bob Dylan
 Roger Ebert
 Robert Evans
 William A. Fraker
 Tak Fujimoto
 Jerry Goldsmith
 Conrad L. Hall
 James Wong Howe
 Quincy Jones
 Pauline Kael
 László Kovács
 Giorgio Moroder
 Ennio Morricone
 Harry Nilsson
 Jack Nitzsche
 Mike Oldfield
 Polly Platt
 Owen Roizman
 Andrew Sarris
 Lalo Schifrin
 David Shire
 Bert Schneider
 Thelma Schoonmaker
 Gene Siskel
 Vittorio Storaro
 Robert Towne
 Tom Waits
 Haskell Wexler
 John Williams
 Gordon Willis
 Vangelis
 Vilmos Zsigmond

List of selected important and notable films

The following is a chronological list of notable films that are generally considered to be "New Hollywood" productions.

 Dr. Strangelove (1964) ≈
 Mickey One (1965)
 The Chase (1966)
 Who's Afraid of Virginia Woolf? (1966) ≈
 The Wild Angels (1966)
 Seconds (1966)Seconds (John Frankenheimer, 1967) and Point Blank (John Boorman, 1968) - Offscreen ≈
 The Shooting (1966)
 Ride in the Whirlwind (1966)
 You're a Big Boy Now (1966)
 Portrait of Jason (1967)≈
 In the Heat of the Night (1967) ≈
 Bonnie and Clyde (1967)Film History According to Tarantino - ArtReview ≈
 The Graduate (1967) ≈
 In Cold Blood (1967) ≈
 Reflections in a Golden Eye (1967)
 Cool Hand Luke (1967) ≈
 Who's That Knocking at My Door (1967)
 The Dirty Dozen (1967)
 Dont Look Back (1967)≈
 Point Blank (1967)≈
 The Trip (1967)
 David Holzman's Diary (1967) ≈
 Symbiopsychotaxiplasm: Take One (1968)≈
 Faces (1968) ≈
 The Swimmer (1968)
 Coogan's Bluff (1968)
 Greetings (1968)
 2001: A Space Odyssey (1968) ≈
 Planet of the Apes (1968) ≈
 Petulia (1968)
 Rosemary's Baby (1968) ≈
  The Thomas Crown Affair (1968)
 Bullitt (1968) ≈
 Night of the Living Dead (1968)≈
 Head (1968)
 Downhill Racer (1969)
 Alice's Restaurant (1969)
 Easy Rider (1969)≈
 Medium Cool (1969)≈
 Midnight Cowboy (1969)≈
 Putney Swope (1969)≈
 The Rain People (1969)
 Goodbye, Columbus (1969)
 Take the Money and Run (1969)
 The Wild Bunch (1969)≈
 Bob & Carol & Ted & Alice (1969)
 Butch Cassidy and the Sundance Kid (1969)≈
 They Shoot Horses, Don't They? (1969)
 Wanda (1970)When the Movies Mattered - Google Books≈
 Husbands (1970)
 The Boys in the Band (1970)
 Alex in Wonderland (1970)
 Catch-22 (1970)
 MASH (1970)≈
 Love Story (1970)
 Airport (1970)
 The Strawberry Statement (1970)
 Loving (1970)
 The Landlord (1970)
 Kelly's Heroes (1970)
 Five Easy Pieces (1970)≈
 Little Big Man (1970)
 Brewster McCloud (1970)
 Joe (1970)
 Woodstock (1970)≈
 The Ballad of Cable Hogue (1970)
 Zabriskie Point (1970)
 Gimme Shelter (1970)
 A New Leaf (1971)≈
 Drive, He Said (1971)
 Fiddler on the Roof (1971)
 The Panic in Needle Park (1971)
 Play Misty for Me (1971)
 Klute (1971)
 The Beguiled (1971)
 A Safe Place (1971)
 McCabe & Mrs. Miller (1971)≈
 Carnal Knowledge (1971)
 Such Good Friends (1971)
 Two-Lane Blacktop (1971)≈
 The Hospital  (1971)
 The Last Movie (1971)
 The Last Picture Show (1971)≈
 The French Connection (1971)≈
 A Clockwork Orange (1971)≈
 Dirty Harry (1971)≈
 Harold and Maude (1971)≈
 Straw Dogs (1971)
 Sweet Sweetback's Baadasssss Song (1971)≈
 THX 1138 (1971)
 Little Murders (1971)
 Vanishing Point (1971)
 Billy Jack  (1971)
 Duel (1971)
 The Heartbreak Kid (1972)
 Cabaret (1972)≈
 Deliverance (1972)≈
 Tomorrow (1972)
 Pocket Money (1972)
 Bad Company (1972)
 The Last House on the Left (1972)
 Fat City (1972)
 Fritz the Cat (1972)
 Images (1972)
 The Poseidon Adventure (1972)
 Slaughterhouse-Five (1972)
 The Godfather (1972)≈
 Junior Bonner (1972)
 Boxcar Bertha (1972)
 The King of Marvin Gardens (1972)
 What's Up, Doc? (1972)
 Last Tango in Paris (1972)
 Payday (1972)
 Sounder (1972)≈
 Heavy Traffic (1973)
 American Graffiti (1973)≈
 Badlands (1973)≈
 Dillinger (1973)
 The Friends of Eddie Coyle (1973)
 The Long Goodbye (1973)≈
 The Last Detail (1973)
 Mean Streets (1973)≈
 Paper Moon (1973)
 Charley Varrick (1973)
 The Last American Hero (1973)
 Pat Garrett and Billy the Kid (1973)
 Breezy (1973)
 Blume in Love (1973)
 Serpico (1973)
 Sisters (1973)
 Sleeper (1973)
 The Exorcist (1973)≈
 Scarecrow (1973)
 The Sting (1973)≈
 Electra Glide in Blue (1973)
 Westworld (1973)
 Alice Doesn't Live Here Anymore (1974)
 Thieves Like Us (1974)
 Harry and Tonto (1974)
 Dark Star (1974)
 California Split (1974)
 Thunderbolt and Lightfoot (1974)
 Chinatown (1974)≈
 The Conversation (1974)≈
 The Godfather Part II (1974)≈
 The Sugarland Express (1974)
 The Parallax View (1974)
 A Woman Under the Influence (1974)≈
 The Taking of Pelham One Two Three (1974)
 The Towering Inferno (1974)
 Blazing Saddles (1974)≈
 Young Frankenstein (1974)≈
 Hearts and Minds (1974)≈
 The Texas Chainsaw Massacre (1974)
 Death Wish (1974)
 Freebie and the Bean (1974)
 Hester Street (1975)≈
 One Flew Over the Cuckoo's Nest (1975)≈
 Dog Day Afternoon (1975)≈
 Three Days of the Condor (1975)
 The Eiger Sanction (1975)
 Rafferty and the Gold Dust Twins (1975)
 Jaws (1975)≈
 Nashville (1975)≈
 Smile (1975)
 Night Moves (1975)
 Shampoo (1975)
 The Day of the Locust (1975)
 Barry Lyndon (1975)
 The Wind and the Lion (1975)
 At Long Last Love (1975)
 The Killing of a Chinese Bookie (1976)
 Mikey and Nicky (1976)
 All the President's Men (1976)≈
 Next Stop, Greenwich Village (1976)
 Carrie (1976)≈
 Obsession (1976)
 The Omen (1976)
 The Outlaw Josey Wales (1976)≈
 God Told Me To (1976)
 Assault on Precinct 13 (1976)
 Network (1976)≈
 Rocky (1976)≈
 Taxi Driver (1976)≈
 Buffalo Bill and the Indians (1976)News and Commentary – Robert Altman: The New Hollywood Years - MidCenturyCinema
 Futureworld (1976)
 Annie Hall (1977)≈
 Close Encounters of the Third Kind (1977)≈
 Eraserhead (1977)≈
 The Hills Have Eyes (1977)
 The Gauntlet (1977)
 High Anxiety (1977)
  The Late Show (1977)
 Handle with Care (1977)
 Looking for Mr. Goodbar (1977)
 New York, New York (1977)A Brief History Of New Hollywood | The Fall - Little White Lies on YouTube
 Opening Night (1977)
 Saturday Night Fever (1977)≈
 Sorcerer (1977)
 Star Wars (1977)≈
 3 Women (1977)
 Girlfriends (1978)≈
 An Unmarried Woman (1978)
 Blue Collar (1978)
 Coming Home (1978)
 Straight Time (1978)
 Grease (1978)≈
 Days of Heaven (1978)≈
 The Deer Hunter (1978)≈
 F.I.S.T. (1978)
 Interiors (1978)
 Big Wednesday (1978)
 Fingers (1978)
 Invasion of the Body Snatchers (1978)
 National Lampoon's Animal House (1978)≈
 Coma (1978)
 Who'll Stop the Rain (1978)
 Midnight Express (1978)
 Dawn of the Dead (1978)
 Halloween (1978)≈
 The China Syndrome (1979)
 Alien (1979)≈
 All That Jazz (1979)≈
  ...And Justice for All (1979)
 Hardcore (1979)
 Apocalypse Now (1979)≈
 Being There (1979)≈
 Kramer vs. Kramer (1979)
 Manhattan (1979)≈
 Wise Blood (1979)
 1941 (1979)
 Melvin and Howard (1980)
 The Shining (1980)≈
 Popeye (1980)
 Bronco Billy (1980)
 Raging Bull (1980)≈
 The Empire Strikes Back (1980)10 Best Films Of The American New Wave, According To IMDb - Screen Rant≈
 American Gigolo (1980)
 Cruising (1980)
 Dressed to Kill (1980)
 Airplane! (1980)≈
 Stardust Memories (1980)
 Heaven's Gate (1980)
 History of the World, Part I (1981)
 Blow Out (1981)
 Raiders of the Lost Ark (1981)≈
 Cutter's Way (1981)
 Reds (1981)
 They All Laughed (1981)
 Blade Runner (1982)≈
 E.T. the Extra-Terrestrial (1982)≈
 One from the Heart (1982)
 The King of Comedy (1982)New Wave, New Hollywood: Reasessment, Recovery and Legacy - Google Books (pg.17)
 Return of the Jedi (1983)≈
 Rumble Fish (1983)
 Twilight Zone: The Movie (1983)

Notes
 ≈ indicates a National Film Registry inductee

See also

 Classical Hollywood cinema
 Counterculture of the 1960s
 Golden Age of Television (2000s–present) – similar to New Hollywood in content
 A Decade Under the Influence – the 2003 documentary about the New Hollywood
 Easy Riders, Raging Bulls – Peter Biskind's controversial account of this era of filmmaking
 Cinephilia
 Exploitation film – popular during that time
 Vulgar auteurism
 Modernist film
 European art cinema – popular with audiences during this time period
 L.A. Rebellion – alternative African-American cinema in the 1970s–1980s
 Midnight movie – popular during this era
 Postmodernist film and television
 Minimalist and maximalist cinema
 Hippie exploitation films
 Blaxploitation
 Indiewood

References

Bibliography

 
 Biskind, Peter (1990). The Godfather Companion: Everything You Ever Wanted to Know About All Three Godfather Films (HarperPerennial)
 
 
 Cook, David A. "Auteur Cinema and the film generation in 70s Hollywood", in The New American Cinema. Ed. by Jon Lewis. NY: Duke University Press, 1998, pp. 1–37
 
 Harris, Mark. Scenes from a Revolution: The Birth of the New Hollywood. Canongate Books, 2009.
 James, David E. Allegories of Cinema: American Film in the Sixties. NY: Princeton University Press, 1989, pp. 1–42
 Kael, Pauline. "Bonnie and Clyde", in For Keeps. Ed. by Pauline Kael. NY: Plume, 1994, pp. 141–57.
 Kael, Pauline. "Trash, Art, and the Movies", in Going Steady: Film Writings 1968–69. NY: Marion Boyers, 1994, pp. 87–129
 Kanfer, Stefan, "The Shock of Freedom in Films", Time Magazine, Dec 8, 1967, Accessed 25 April 2009, 
 
 Kirshner, Jonathan. Hollywood's Last Golden Age: Politics, Society, and the Seventies Film in America. Ithaca: Cornell University Press, 2012. 
 
 
 Road Trip to Nowhere: Hollywood Encounters the Counterculture, Jon Lewis, 2022
 
 
 
 New Wave, New Hollywood: Reassessment, Recovery and Legacy, Nathan Abram and Gregory Frame, 2021

External links
 "The First Five Years of the 70s" episode of Siskel and Ebert The American Revolution-DGA
 "The Film School Generation" episode of American Cinema'' at Annenberg Learner

American
1960s in film
1970s in film
1980s in film
Cinema of the United States
History of film
History of Hollywood, Los Angeles
Movements in cinema
1960s in American cinema
1970s in American cinema
1980s in American cinema
Film genres particular to the United States
1964 establishments in the United States
1983 disestablishments in the United States
1970s in animation
Modern art
Postmodern art